On Stage is an American radio show also known as On Stage with Cathy and Elliott Lewis and Cathy and Elliott Lewis on Stage. It was an anthology program that aired on CBS for two seasons from 1953 to 1954.

Origin 
Elliott and Cathy Lewis had wanted a half-hour weekly show over which they had creative control as early as 1946. On Stage came about as radio was in a time of transition due to the popularity of television. Elliott, an actor, director, writer, and producer, wanted to do an anthology series with his wife, Cathy. Elliott was starring on The Phil Harris-Alice Faye Show and directing Suspense. Cathy Lewis performed on many programs and was starring as Jane Stacy on My Friend Irma. Elliott served as transcriber, director, producer, and actor of On Stage. He also edited the episodes and wrote the openings and closings.

Format 
Episodes began with "The Cathy and Elliott Theme" by Ray Noble, the following introduction, and a greeting from the hosts with information about the episode. "Cathy Lewis, Elliott Lewis, two of the most distinguished names in radio, appearing each week in their own theater, starring in a repertory of transcribed stories of their own and your choosing. Radio's foremost players in radio's foremost plays. Dramas, comedy, adventure, mystery and melodrama."The stories were of all genres—romance, drama, comedy, thriller, western, adventure and literary classic. Both experienced and up-and-coming writers contributed scripts. Contributors included Morton Fine, David Friedkin, Shirley Gordon, E. Jack Neuman, Richard Chandlee, and Antony Ellis.

At the center of each episode was the relationship between the characters played by the Lewises. They were sometimes lovers or spouses; sometimes family or friends; sometimes strangers; and occasionally enemies.

Episodes ended with a concluding dialogue between the stars and a statement about the next week's title and its writer.

Reception 
A review in Broadcast Television called the Lewises "experts at underplay."

Episodes 
Many episodes of On Stage are thought to be no longer in existence, though over three dozen are publicly available online. Some of these lack the introductions and closings. Titles and air dates appear in Martin Grams' Radio drama: A Comprehensive Chronicle of American Network Programs, 1932-1962. Information regarding the cast and crew comes from the episodes themselves, or from the original scripts. Plots of lost episodes come from newspaper listings or from the original scripts.

References

External links

Streaming
Episodes of On Stage from Old Radio Programs
Episodes of On Stage from Old Time Radio Researchers Group Library

Logs
Log of episodes of On Stage from Jerry Haendiges Vintage Radio Logs
Log of episodes of On Stage from Old Time Radio Researchers Group
Log of episodes of On Stage (including casts) from radioGOLDINdex

Scripts
Scripts of selected episodes of On Stage from the Generic Radio Workshop
Script for one episode of On Stage from Old Time Radio Researchers Group
Scripts of "Call Me a Cab" and "Saralee, You Are Lovely As The Summer Night" episodes of On Stage from Simply Scripts

American radio dramas
Anthology radio series
CBS Radio programs
1950s American radio programs
1953 radio programme debuts
1954 radio programme endings